The ninth season of Mad TV, an American sketch comedy series, originally aired in the United States on the Fox Network between September 13, 2003, and May 22, 2004.

Summary 
Similar to its rival show, Saturday Night Live, this season saw a considerable shake-up in the cast and much hiring and promotion to fill the void. Longtime cast member and last member of the original 1995-1996 cast, Debra Wilson, left the show, leaving this cast as the first with no one from the first season. Ike Barinholtz, Josh Meyers, Ron Pederson, and Paul Vogt were upgraded to repertory status, while Simon Helberg was let go. New cast members hired this season include: Daniele Gaither, a member of The Groundlings who was trained by cast member Michael McDonald, a former cast member of the short-lived WB sketch show Hype, and an extra on an early episode of MADtv in a blaxploitation parody about Bob Dole; Nicole Parker (who also appeared in a past episode of MADtv as an extra. Parker appeared in the music video parody of The Calling's "Wherever You Will Go" as the woman getting tattoos on her arm of The Calling's, Creed's, Pearl Jam's, and Ray Charles' names); Keegan-Michael Key and Jordan Peele (who were originally hired because FOX was on the fence about whether to hire them both or pick one over the other. After seeing their comedic chemistry and ability to generate hilarious celebrity impressions and original characters, FOX decided to keep Key and Peele on the show); Melissa Paull, and Gillian Vigman.

Season nine is home to the show's 200th episode, featuring appearances from former cast members Orlando Jones, Nicole Sullivan, Alex Borstein, Will Sasso, Artie Lange, and Phil LaMarr. Other guests this season include Jessica Alba, Tommy Davidson, Fred Willard, Gregory Helms, Trish Stratus, Tony Hawk, Jeff Probst, Cedric the Entertainer, Frankie Muniz,  Tom Bergeron, and Jennifer Coolidge.

This season is the last season for Mo Collins and the only season for Melissa Paull and Gillian Vigman.

Opening montage 
The title sequence begins with the Mad TV logo appearing above the Los Angeles skyline. The theme song, performed by the hip-hop group Heavy D & the Boyz, begins and each repertory cast member is introduced alphabetically, followed by the featured cast. The screen dissolves into three live-action clips of an individual cast member. The three screens multiply until they occupy the entire screen. A still photo of the cast member appears on the screen with a caption of his/her name superimposed on it. When all cast members and guests are introduced, the music stops and the title sequence ends with the phrase "You are now watching Mad TV".

Cast 

Repertory cast members
 Ike Barinholtz  (22/25 episodes) 
 Frank Caliendo  (20/25 episodes) 
 Mo Collins  (14/25 episodes) 
 Bobby Lee  (21/25 episodes) 
 Michael McDonald  (22/25 episodes) 
 Josh Meyers  (23/25 episodes) 
 Ron Pederson  (23/25 episodes) 
 Aries Spears  (22/25 episodes) 
 Paul Vogt  (24/25 episodes) 
 Stephnie Weir  (25/25 episodes) 

Featured cast members
 Daniele Gaither  (19/25 episodes) 
 Keegan-Michael Key  (9/25 episodes) 
 Nicole Parker  (19/25 episodes) 
 Melissa Paull  (4/25 episodes) 
 Jordan Peele  (14/25 episodes) 
 Gillian Vigman  (14/25 episodes)

Episodes

Home releases 
Season 9 of Mad TV has not been released on DVD. However, several sketches culled from this season appear on a compilation DVD called Mad TV: The Best of Seasons 8, 9, and 10 (first released on October 25, 2005).

As of 2020, season 9 is now available on HBO Max, with episodes 1, 4, 11, 14, and 19 missing. Episode 9 initially was unavailable due to technical issues, but is now playable.

External links 
 Mad TV - Official Website
 

09
2003 American television seasons
2004 American television seasons